XET-TDT is a television station in Monterrey, Nuevo Leon, owned and operated by Televisa. The station carries the Canal 5 network.

History 
XET-TV analog channel 6 began broadcasting in 1960, as the first station of Televisión Independiente de México, founded by Bernardo Garza Sada. TIM, backed by Monterrey-area business interests, grew rapidly in the ensuing years, expanding to Mexico City in 1968 and merging with Telesistema Mexicano in 1972 to form Televisa. It remained with the Galavisión/XEQ network, formed from TIM's Mexico City station until the 2000s, when it switched to Canal 5.

Digital television 

On September 24, 2015, XET shut off its analog signal; its digital signal on UHF channel 31 remained.

References

External links
 Televisa Monterrey

Canal 5 (Mexico) transmitters
Spanish-language television stations in Mexico
Television stations in Monterrey